Perez v. Brownell, 356 U.S. 44 (1958), was a United States Supreme Court case in which the Court affirmed Congress's right to revoke United States citizenship as a result of a citizen's voluntary performance of specified actions, even in the absence of any intent or desire on the person's part to lose citizenship.  Specifically, the Supreme Court upheld an act of Congress which provided for revocation of citizenship as a consequence of voting in a foreign election.

The precedent  was repudiated nine years later in Afroyim v. Rusk, in which the Supreme Court held that the Fourteenth Amendment's Citizenship Clause guaranteed citizens' right to keep their  citizenship and overturned the same law that it had upheld in Perez.

Background 
Clemente Martinez Perez was born in  El Paso, Texas, on March 17, 1909. He resided in the United States  until 1919 or 1920, when his parents took him to Mexico. In 1928, he was informed that he had been born in the state of Texas.

During World War II, he applied for admission and was admitted into the United States as a Mexican alien railroad worker. His application for such entry contained his recitation that he was a native-born citizen of Mexico. By 1947, however, Perez had returned to Mexico, and in that year, he applied for admission to the United States as a citizen of the United States. Upon his arrival, he was charged with failing to register under the Selective Service Laws of the United States during the war.

Under oath, Perez admitted that between 1944 and 1947, he had remained outside the United States to avoid military service and had voted in an election in Mexico in 1946.

On  May 15, 1953, he surrendered to immigration authorities in San Francisco as an alien unlawfully in the United States but claimed that he was a citizen of the United States by birth and thereby entitled to remain. The US District Court, however, found that Perez had lost his American citizenship, a decision that was affirmed by the court of appeals.

The courts held that Congress can attach loss of citizenship only as a consequence of conduct engaged in voluntarily even if there was no intent or desire to lose citizenship. The law was enacted as the Nationality Act of 1940 (54 Stat 1137, as amended).

Decision 
In 1958, a divided Supreme Court upheld the decisions because Perez "became involved in foreign political affairs and evidenced an allegiance to another country inconsistent with American citizenship, thereby abandoning his citizenship."

Two central holdings were these:

Subsequent developments 
The court reversed itself in 1967 with its decision in Afroyim v. Rusk. It called section 401 of the Nationality Act of 1940 unconstitutional and stated that the Fourteenth Amendment prevents Congress from taking away citizenship without the citizen's assent.

See also 
 Nishikawa v. Dulles

References

Further reading

External links 

1958 in United States case law
United States Supreme Court cases
United States Supreme Court cases of the Warren Court
United States Citizenship Clause case law
Overruled United States Supreme Court decisions